Welkenraedt is a municipality of Wallonia located in the province of Liège, Belgium. 

On January 1, 2018, Welkenraedt had a total population of 9,920. The total area is 24.47 km² which gives a population density of 405 inhabitants per km².

The municipality consists of the following districts: Henri-Chapelle and Welkenraedt.

The town and former municipality of Henri-Chapelle is home to the Henri-Chapelle American Cemetery and Memorial which contains the graves of 7,992 members of the American military who died in World War II.

Gallery

Twin towns
 Nove, Italy
 Epfig, France

See also
 List of protected heritage sites in Welkenraedt

References

External links
 

 
Municipalities of Liège Province